is a 1994 Japanese action platform game developed by Game Freak and published by Sega for the Sega Mega Drive. It was released in North America for the Sega Channel in 1995 and has been released on the Virtual Console for the Wii.

Story 
In the 21st century, noted scientist and computer engineer Doc Yoshiyama had succeeded in creating the world's most advanced Artificial Intelligence. He called his creation C-Life and managed to make her aware, thinking and feeling. However, he soon found himself in love with this C-Life girl and wanted to be closer to her, so he digitized and uploaded himself into his computer core, where the two "made love" by combining his DNA and her program core. The end result of their love was the birth of a half human, half C-Life boy named Pulseman. Pulseman was unique in that he did not need to remain inside a computer to survive and had the power to channel electricity through his body, using it both as a weapon and as a means of quick transport through the power of Volteccer.

Unfortunately, living in the computer world for so long twisted Doc Yoshiyama's mind, corrupting his brainwaves and his body. Doc Yoshiyama emerged back into the human world, but twisted and changed into the evil Doc Waruyama. Using a system known as EUREKA, which allows for C-Life beings to manifest in the human world, Doc Waruyama establishes the Galaxy Gang, spreading a new wave of cyber-terrorism across the world and Pulseman must fight his own father and put an end to his gang for the sake of the free world.

Development 
When first announced, Pulseman was originally named Spark. The game was directed by Ken Sugimori. Most of the staff members who worked on Pulseman would later work on the Pokémon series, including Sugimori, designer Satoshi Tajiri, artist Atsuko Nishida and composer Junichi Masuda.

Release 
The game was released in Japan on July 22, 1994. The North American version was released in 1995 via the Sega Channel. Pulseman was re-released for the Wii on the Virtual Console in Japan in 2007 and in North America and Europe in 2009.

Reception 

Upon release, Famitsu gave the game a score of 24 out of 40. Brazilian magazine Super GamePower gave it a 3.5 out of 5 score. Italian magazine Computer+Videogiochi (CVG) gave it a score of 71/100. German magazine Mega Fun gave it a 69/100.

When it was released on the Virtual Console, it received praise from multiple publications. IGN reviewed the Virtual Console version of Pulseman, giving it a score of 8.0 out of 10, therefore receiving IGN's Editor's choice award. In the review, the author praises its graphics as "one of the cleanest, most crisp and most attractive platformers on the Genesis" and that the game "isn't just fun, it's electric." EuroGamer gave it 7/10. Nintendo Life gave it an 8 out of 10.

References

External links 
 
 Sega's page for Pulseman, Virtual Console release 
 Volteccer! Game reference (Web archive)
 Pulseman.co.uk Game reference

1994 video games
Game Freak games
Side-scrolling platform games
Sega Genesis games
Virtual Console games
Artificial intelligence characters in video games
Video game characters with electric or magnetic abilities
Video game superheroes
Single-player video games
Sega video games
Video games set in the 21st century
Video games scored by Junichi Masuda
Video games developed in Japan